J. Alexander's Holdings Inc. is an American restaurant company that operates several casual dining restaurant chains. The company is headquartered in Nashville, Tennessee.

History
The company was founded in 1971 as Volunteer Capital Corporation by three Nashville businessmen, Jack C. Massey, Earl Beasley, Jr. and John Neff, Jr. The first restaurant was opened in Nashville, Tennessee in 1991. The company's expansion plans are national. The company generally seeks markets that have an excess of 1.5 million people in the statistical metropolitan area. J. Alexander's was acquired by Fidelity National Financial in 2012. It was spun off in 2015. It acquired Ninety Nine Restaurant and Pub from Fidelity National Financial in 2017. As of 2019, J. Alexanders has 46 restaurants in 16 different states.

In April 2020, it reported that J. Alexander's received $15.1 million from the Paycheck Protection Program (PPP) as part of the CARES Act, a program intended to assist small businesses during the COVID-19 pandemic in the United States.  Days later, J. Alexander's returned all of the money it had received. 

On July 2, 2021, J. Alexander's announced that it would be acquired by Logan's Roadhouse parent SPB Hospitality for $220 million. The acquisition was completed on September 30, 2021.

Customer service
In 2019, the company was the target of a class action lawsuit for racial discrimination. At a Michigan restaurant, a black customer said she was asked to give up her seat for a white patron . The company denied the charges saying: “The female guest was trying to save a seat for a friend who had not yet arrived, and she was informed that seats in the pub area could not be saved.  She was offered a table for herself and her party in the main dining area, but declined, insisting that she stay in the pub area. Further exacerbating the incident was the misbehavior of a male guest, who approached our manager and began shouting in a disruptive manner, uttering profanity and insults to members of staff. As he and his family were leaving the restaurant, surveillance video shows that another patron - not a restaurant employee - threw a container of food from a take-out order at the male guest and his party. According to surveillance video, the patron who threw the container of food later left the restaurant through the front door after employees attempted to separate the two parties and defuse the altercation to the best of their ability. The West Bloomfield police were called and arrived at the restaurant as guests were leaving.  The police have the contact information of the individual responsible for throwing food. We have turned over the surveillance video to the police department and await a report on their investigation and their determination as to whether any formal charges related to this behavior are warranted.”  After reviewing surveillance footage, no lawsuit was pursued.

References

External links

Restaurant franchises
Restaurants established in 1971
Companies based in Nashville, Tennessee
Regional restaurant chains in the United States
Companies formerly listed on the Nasdaq
Companies listed on the New York Stock Exchange
1971 establishments in Tennessee
2021 mergers and acquisitions